There have been many notable instances of unruly behaviour at classical music concerts, often at the premiere of a new work or production.

18th century

19th century

20th century

21st century

See also

 Succès de scandale
 Claque – Claqueurs are hired to initiate applause, or sometimes booing.

References

Riots
Classical music concerts
History of classical music
Classical